Rubus trivialis, commonly known as southern dewberry, is a species of flowering plant in the rose family (Rosaceae) native to the southern United States and northern Mexico. It is distinguished from northern dewberry (Rubus flagellaris) by its hispid stems. It is a perennial herb and blooms March to April.

References

External links
 

trivialis
Flora of North America